Robert Quayle may refer to:

Robert Howard Quayle in the Isle of Man Government
Robert Quayle, character in Baby Love (film)

Also:  – UK merchant ship and whaler (1814–1838)